Lone Star Law Men is a 1941 American Western film directed by Robert Emmett Tansey and written by Robert Emmett Tansey and Frances Kavanaugh. The film stars Tom Keene, Frank Yaconelli, Betty Miles, Sugar Dawn, Gene Alsace and Glenn Strange. The film was released on December 5, 1941, by Monogram Pictures.

Plot

Cast              
Tom Keene as Tom Sterling
Frank Yaconelli as Lopez Mendoza
Betty Miles as Betty Grey
Sugar Dawn as Sugar Grey
Gene Alsace as Marshal Brady
Glenn Strange as Marshal Scott 
Charles King as Duke Lawson
Fred Hoose as Marshal James
Stanley Price as Moose Mason
James Sheridan as Red
Reed Howes as Ace

References

External links
 

1941 films
1940s English-language films
American Western (genre) films
1941 Western (genre) films
Monogram Pictures films
Films directed by Robert Emmett Tansey
1940s American films